Players and pairs who neither have high enough rankings nor receive wild cards may participate in a qualifying tournament held one week before the annual Wimbledon Tennis Championships.

Seeds

  Camille Benjamin /  Tammy Whittington (qualified)
  Lupita Novelo /  Betsy Somerville (qualifying competition, lucky losers)
  Rika Hiraki /  Akemi Nishiya (qualified)
  Julie Halard /  Anke Huber (qualified)
  Kimiko Date /  Ei Iida (qualifying competition, lucky losers)
  Ingelise Driehuis /  Louise Pleming (first round)
  Amanda Coetzer /  Robyn Field (second round)
  Donna Faber /  Claudine Toleafoa (first round)

Qualifiers

  Camille Benjamin /  Tammy Whittington
  Julie Halard /  Anke Huber
  Rika Hiraki /  Akemi Nishiya
  Barbara Griffiths /  Jane Wood

Lucky losers

  Kimiko Date /  Ei Iida
  Joanne Limmer /  Angie Woolcock
  Lupita Novelo /  Betsy Somerville

Qualifying draw

First qualifier

Second qualifier

Third qualifier

Fourth qualifier

External links

1991 Wimbledon Championships – Women's draws and results at the International Tennis Federation

Women's Doubles Qualifying
Wimbledon Championship by year – Women's doubles qualifying
Wimbledon Championships